The Canadian Pacific Railway , also known simply as CPR or Canadian Pacific and formerly as CP Rail (1968–1996), is a Canadian Class I railway incorporated in 1881. The railway is owned by Canadian Pacific Railway Limited, which began operations as legal owner in a corporate restructuring in 2001.

Its rail network also serves Minneapolis–St. Paul, Milwaukee, Detroit, Chicago, and Albany, New York, in the United States.

The railway was first built between eastern Canada and British Columbia between 1881 and 1885 (connecting with Ottawa Valley and Georgian Bay area lines built earlier), fulfilling a commitment extended to British Columbia when it entered Confederation in 1871; the CPR was Canada's first transcontinental railway. Primarily a freight railway, the CPR was for decades the only practical means of long-distance passenger transport in most regions of Canada and was instrumental in the settlement and development of Western Canada. The CPR became one of the largest and most powerful companies in Canada, a position it held as late as 1975.

The company acquired two American lines in 2009: the Dakota, Minnesota and Eastern Railroad (DM&E) and the Iowa, Chicago and Eastern Railroad (IC&E). The trackage of the IC&E was at one time part of CP subsidiary Soo Line and predecessor line The Milwaukee Road. The combined DM&E/IC&E system spanned North Dakota, South Dakota, Minnesota, Wisconsin, Nebraska and Iowa, with two short stretches into Kansas City, Missouri, and Chicago, Illinois. Also, the company owns the Indiana Harbor Belt Railroad, a Hammond, Indiana-based terminal railroad along with Conrail Shared Assets Operations. CP's ownership of that railroad traces back to the Soo Line's ownership, inherited from the Milwaukee Road.

The CPR is publicly traded on both the Toronto Stock Exchange and the New York Stock Exchange under the ticker CP. Its U.S. headquarters are in Minneapolis. As of January 14, 2022, the largest shareholder of Canadian Pacific stock is TCI Fund Management Limited, a London-based hedge fund that owns 8.38% of the company.

On March 15, 2023, the railroad successfully received approval to purchase and merge with the Kansas City Southern Railway for $31 billion. Once effective as soon as April 14, 2023, the combined railroad will be the first and only to directly serve Canada, Mexico and the United States.

History
Together with the Canadian Confederation, the creation of the Canadian Pacific Railway was a task originally undertaken as the National Dream by the Conservative government of Prime Minister John A. Macdonald (1st Canadian Ministry). He was helped by Alexander Tilloch Galt, who was the owner of the North Western Coal and Navigation Company. British Columbia, a four-month sea voyage away from the East Coast, had insisted upon a land transport link to the East as a condition for joining Confederation (initially requesting a wagon road).

In 1873, John A. Macdonald and other high-ranking politicians, bribed in the Pacific Scandal, granted federal contracts to Hugh Allan's Canada Pacific Railway Company (which was unrelated to the current company) rather than to David Lewis Macpherson's Inter-Ocean Railway Company which was thought to have connections to the American Northern Pacific Railway Company. Because of this scandal, the Conservative Party was removed from office in 1873. The new Liberal prime minister, Alexander Mackenzie, ordered construction of segments of the railway as a public enterprise under the supervision of the Department of Public Works led by Sandford Fleming. Surveying was carried out during the first years of a number of alternative routes in this virgin territory followed by construction of a telegraph along the lines that had been agreed upon. The Thunder Bay section linking Lake Superior to Winnipeg was commenced in 1875.

With Macdonald's return to power on 16 October 1878, a more aggressive construction policy was adopted. Macdonald confirmed that Port Moody would be the terminus of the transcontinental railway, and announced that the railway would follow the Fraser and Thompson rivers between Port Moody and Kamloops. In 1879, the federal government floated bonds in London and called for tenders to construct the  section of the railway from Yale, British Columbia, to Savona's Ferry, on Kamloops Lake. The contract was awarded to Andrew Onderdonk, whose men started work on 15 May 1880. After the completion of that section, Onderdonk received contracts to build between Yale and Port Moody, and between Savona's Ferry and Eagle Pass.

On 21 October 1880, a new syndicate, unrelated to Hugh Allan's, signed a contract with the Macdonald government. Fleming was dismissed and replaced with Collingwood Schreiber as chief engineer and general manager of all government railways. The government transferred to the new company those sections of the railway it had constructed under government ownership, on which it had already spent at least $25 million. But its estimates of the cost of the Rocky Mountain section alone was over $60 million. The government also defrayed surveying costs and exempted the railway from property taxes for 20 years. The Montreal-based syndicate officially comprised five men: George Stephen, James J. Hill, Duncan McIntyre, Richard B. Angus and John Stewart Kennedy. Donald A. Smith and Norman Kittson were unofficial silent partners with a significant financial interest. On 15 February 1881, legislation confirming the contract received royal assent, and the Canadian Pacific Railway Company was formally incorporated the next day. Critics claimed that the government gave too large a subsidy for the proposed project but this was to incorporate uncertainties of risk and irreversibility of insurance. The large subsidy also needed to compensate the CPR for not constructing the line in the future, but rather right away even though demand would not cover operational costs.

A beaver was chosen as the railway's logo in honour of Donald Smith, 1st Baron Strathcona and Mount Royal, who had risen from factor to governor of the Hudson's Bay Company over a lengthy career in the beaver fur trade. Smith was a principal financier of the CPR. staking much of his personal wealth to the venture. In 1885, he drove the last spike to complete the transcontinental line.

Building the railway, 1881–1886

Building the railway took over four years. James J. Hill in 1881 sent Alpheus Beede Stickney to be construction superintendent for the Canadian Pacific Railway. The Canadian Pacific Railway began its westward expansion from Bonfield, Ontario (previously called Callander Station), where the first spike was driven into a sunken railway tie. Bonfield was inducted into Canadian Railway Hall of Fame in 2002 as the CPR first spike location. That was the point where the Canada Central Railway extension ended. The CCR was owned by Duncan McIntyre, who amalgamated it with the CPR, and became one of the handful of officers of the newly formed CPR. The CCR started in Brockville and extended to Pembroke. It then followed a westward route along the Ottawa River passing through places like Cobden, Deux-Rivières and eventually to Mattawa at the confluence of the Mattawa and Ottawa rivers. It then proceeded cross-country towards its final destination of Bonfield. Duncan McIntyre and his contractor James Worthington piloted the CPR expansion. Worthington continued on as the construction superintendent for the CPR past Bonfield. He remained with the CPR for about a year after which he left the company. McIntyre was uncle to John Ferguson who staked out future North Bay and who became the town's wealthiest inhabitant and mayor for four successive terms.

It was presumed that the railway would travel through the rich "Fertile Belt" of the North Saskatchewan River Valley and cross the Rocky Mountains via the Yellowhead Pass, a route suggested by Fleming based on a decade of work. However, the CPR quickly discarded this plan in favour of a more southerly route across the arid Palliser's Triangle in Saskatchewan and via Kicking Horse Pass and down the Field Hill to the Rocky Mountain Trench. This route was more direct and closer to the Canada–US border, making it easier for the CPR to keep American railways from encroaching on the Canadian market. However, this route also had several disadvantages.

One was that the CPR would need to find a route through the Selkirk Mountains in British Columbia while, at the time, it was not known whether a route even existed. The job of finding a pass was assigned to a surveyor named Major Albert Bowman Rogers. The CPR promised him a cheque for $5,000 and that the pass would be named in his honour. Rogers became obsessed with finding the pass that would immortalize his name. He discovered the pass in April 1881 and, true to its word, the CPR named it "Rogers Pass" and gave him the cheque. However, he at first refused to cash it, preferring to frame it, saying he did not do it for the money. He later agreed to cash it with the promise of an engraved watch.

Another obstacle was that the proposed route crossed land in Alberta that was controlled by the Blackfoot First Nation. This difficulty was overcome when a missionary priest, Albert Lacombe, persuaded the Blackfoot chief Crowfoot that construction of the railway was inevitable. In return for his assent, Crowfoot was famously rewarded with a lifetime pass to ride the CPR.

A more lasting consequence of the choice of route was that, unlike the one proposed by Fleming, the land surrounding the railway often proved too arid for successful agriculture. The CPR may have placed too much reliance on a report from naturalist John Macoun, who had crossed the prairies at a time of very high rainfall and had reported that the area was fertile.

The greatest disadvantage of the route was in Kicking Horse Pass, at the Alberta-British Columbia border on the continental divide. This was over four times the maximum gradient recommended for railways of this era, and even modern railways rarely exceed a two-percent gradient. However, this route was far more direct than one through the Yellowhead Pass and saved hours for both passengers and freight. This section of track was the CPR's Big Hill. Safety switches were installed at several points, the speed limit for descending trains was set at 10 km per hour (6 mph), and special locomotives were ordered. Despite these measures, several serious runaways still occurred including the first locomotive, which belonged to the contractors, to descend the line. CPR officials insisted that this was a temporary expediency, but this state of affairs would last for 25 years until the completion of the Spiral Tunnels in the early 20th century.

In 1881, construction progressed at a pace too slow for the railway's officials who, in 1882, hired the renowned railway executive William Cornelius Van Horne to oversee construction with the inducement of a generous salary and the intriguing challenge of handling such a difficult railway project. Van Horne stated that he would have  of main line built in 1882. The Thunder Bay branch (west from Fort William) was completed in June 1882 by the Department of Railways and Canals and turned over to the company in May 1883, permitting all-Canadian lake and railway traffic from Eastern Canada to Winnipeg for the first time. By the end of 1883, the railway had reached the Rocky Mountains, just eight kilometres (five miles) east of Kicking Horse Pass. The construction seasons of 1884 and 1885 would be spent in the mountains of British Columbia and on the north shore of Lake Superior.

Many thousands of navvies worked on the railway. Many were European immigrants. In British Columbia, government contractors eventually hired 17,000 workers from China, known as "coolies". A navvy received between $1 and $2.50 per day, but had to pay for his own food, clothing, transport to the job site, mail and medical care. After 2 months of hard labour, they could net as little as $16. Chinese labourers in British Columbia made only between 75 cents and $1.25 a day, paid in rice mats, and not including expenses, leaving barely anything to send home. They did the most dangerous construction jobs, such as working with explosives to clear tunnels through rock. The exact number of Chinese workers who died is unknown but historians estimate the number is between 600 and 800. The victims of sickness and accidents were not given proper funerals. Most of the remains were buried into the railway and the families of the Chinese who were killed received no compensation, or even notification of loss of life. Many of the men who survived did not have enough money to return to their families in China, although Chinese labour contractors had promised that as part of their responsibilities. Many spent years in isolated and often poor conditions. Yet the Chinese were hard working and played a key role in building the Western stretch of the railway; even some boys as young as twelve years old served as tea-boys. In 2006, the then-Prime Minister offered an apology for the treatment of Chinese workers, both during and following the construction of the CPR.

By 1883, railway construction was progressing rapidly, but the CPR was in danger of running out of funds. In response, on 31 January 1884, the government passed the Railway Relief Bill, providing a further $22.5 million in loans to the CPR. The bill received royal assent on 6 March 1884.

In March 1885, the North-West Rebellion broke out in the District of Saskatchewan. Van Horne, in Ottawa at the time, suggested to the government that the CPR could transport troops to Qu'Appelle, Assiniboia, in 10 days. Some sections of track were incomplete or had not been used before, but the trip to Winnipeg was made in nine days and the rebellion quickly suppressed. Perhaps because the government was grateful for this service, they subsequently reorganized the CPR's debt and provided a further $5 million loan. This money was desperately needed by the CPR. However, this government loan later became controversial. Even with Van Horne's support with moving troops to Qu'Appelle, the government still delayed in giving its support to CPR. This was due to Macdonald putting pressure on George Stephen for additional benefits. Stephen himself later did admit to spending $1 million between 1881 and 1886 to ensure government support. This money went to buying a £40,000 necklace for Lady MacDonald and numerous other "bonifications" to government members.

On 7 November 1885, the last spike was driven at Craigellachie, British Columbia, making good on the original promise. Four days earlier, the last spike of the Lake Superior section was driven in just west of Jackfish, Ontario. While the railway was completed four years after the original 1881 deadline, it was completed more than five years ahead of the new date of 1891 that Macdonald gave in 1881. The successful construction of such a massive project, although troubled by delays and scandal, was considered an impressive feat of engineering and political will for a country with such a small population, limited capital, and difficult terrain. It was by far the longest railway ever constructed at the time. It had taken 12,000 men and 5,000 horses to construct the Lake section alone.

Meanwhile, in Eastern Canada, the CPR had created a network of lines reaching from Quebec City to St. Thomas, Ontario, by 1885 mainly by buying the Quebec, Montreal, Ottawa & Occidental Railway from the Quebec government and by creating a new railway company, the Ontario and Quebec Railway (O&Q). It also launched a fleet of Great Lakes ships to link its terminals. Through the O&Q, the CPR had effected purchases and long-term leases of several railways, and built a line between Perth, Ontario, and Toronto (completed on 5 May 1884) to connect these acquisitions. The CPR obtained a 999-year lease on the O&Q on 4 January 1884. In 1895, it acquired a minority interest in the Toronto, Hamilton and Buffalo Railway, giving it a link to New York and the Northeast United States.

1886–1900

The last spike in the CPR was driven on 7 November 1885, by one of its directors, Donald Smith.

The first transcontinental passenger train departed from Montreal's Dalhousie Station, located at Berri Street and Notre Dame Street at 8 pm on 28 June 1886, and arrived at Port Moody at noon on 4 July. This train consisted of two baggage cars, a mail car, one second-class coach, two immigrant sleepers, two first-class coaches, two sleeping cars and a diner (several dining cars were used throughout the journey, as they were removed from the train during the night, with another one added the next morning).

By that time, however, the CPR had decided to move its western terminus from Port Moody to Granville, which was renamed "Vancouver" later that year. The first official train destined for Vancouver arrived on 23 May 1887, although the line had already been in use for three months. The CPR quickly became profitable, and all loans from the federal government were repaid years ahead of time. In 1888, a branch line was opened between Sudbury and Sault Ste. Marie where the CPR connected with the American railway system and its own steamships. That same year, work was started on a line from London, Ontario, to the Canada–US border at Windsor, Ontario. That line opened on 12 June 1890.

The CPR also leased the New Brunswick Railway in 1891 for 991 years, and built the International Railway of Maine, connecting Montreal with Saint John, New Brunswick, in 1889. The connection with Saint John on the Atlantic coast made the CPR the first truly transcontinental railway company in Canada and permitted trans-Atlantic cargo and passenger services to continue year-round when sea ice in the Gulf of St. Lawrence closed the port of Montreal during the winter months. By 1896, competition with the Great Northern Railway for traffic in southern British Columbia forced the CPR to construct a second line across the province, south of the original line. Van Horne, now president of the CPR, asked for government aid, and the government agreed to provide around $3.6 million to construct a railway from Lethbridge, Alberta, through Crowsnest Pass to the south shore of Kootenay Lake, in exchange for the CPR agreeing to reduce freight rates in perpetuity for key commodities shipped in Western Canada.

The controversial Crowsnest Pass Agreement effectively locked the eastbound rate on grain products and westbound rates on certain "settlers' effects" at the 1897 level. Although temporarily suspended during the First World War, it was not until 1983 that the "Crow Rate" was permanently replaced by the Western Grain Transportation Act, which allowed the gradual increase of grain shipping prices. The Crowsnest Pass line opened on 18 June 1898, and followed a complicated route through the maze of valleys and passes in southern British Columbia, rejoining the original mainline at Hope after crossing the Cascade Mountains via Coquihalla Pass.

The Southern Mainline, generally known as the Kettle Valley Railway in British Columbia, was built in response to the booming mining and smelting economy in southern British Columbia, and the tendency of the local geography to encourage and enable easier access from neighbouring US states than from Vancouver or the rest of Canada, which was viewed to be as much of a threat to national security as it was to the province's control of its own resources. The local passenger service was re-routed to this new southerly line, which connected numerous emergent small cities across the region. Independent railways and subsidiaries that were eventually merged into the CPR in connection with this route were the Shuswap and Okanagan Railway, the Kaslo and Slocan Railway, the Columbia and Kootenay Railway, the Columbia and Western Railway and various others.

Settlement of western Canada

The CPR had built a railway that operated mostly in the wilderness. The usefulness of the prairies was questionable in the minds of many. The thinking prevailed that the prairies had great potential. Under the initial contract with the Canadian government to build the railway, the CPR was granted . Proving already to be a very resourceful organization, Canadian Pacific began an intense campaign to bring immigrants to Canada. Canadian Pacific agents operated in many overseas locations. Immigrants were often sold a package that included passage on a CP ship, travel on a CP train and land sold by the CP railway. Land was priced at $2.50 an acre and up but required cultivation. To transport immigrants, Canadian Pacific developed a fleet of over a thousand Colonist cars, low-budget sleeper cars designed to transport immigrant families from eastern Canadian seaports to the west.

1901–1928

During the first decade of the 20th century, the CPR continued to build more lines. In 1908, the CPR opened a line connecting Toronto with Sudbury. Previously, westbound traffic originating in southern Ontario took a circuitous route through eastern Ontario. Several operational improvements were also made to the railway in Western Canada. In 1909 the CPR completed two significant engineering accomplishments. The most significant was the replacement of the Big Hill, which had become a major bottleneck in the CPR's main line, with the Spiral Tunnels, reducing the grade to 2.2 percent from 4.5 percent. The Spiral Tunnels opened in August. In April 1908, the CPR started work to replace the Old Calgary-Edmonton Rail Bridge across the Red Deer River with a new standard steel bridge that was completed by March 1909.

On 3 November 1909, the Lethbridge Viaduct over the Oldman River valley at Lethbridge, Alberta, was opened. In 1916, the CPR replaced its line through Rogers Pass, which was prone to avalanches (the most serious of which killed 62 men in 1910) with the Connaught Tunnel, an eight-kilometre-long (5-mile) tunnel under Mount Macdonald that was, at the time of its opening, the longest railway tunnel in the Western Hemisphere.

On 21 January 1910, a passenger train derailed on the CPR line at the Spanish River bridge at Nairn, Ontario (near Sudbury), killing at least 43.

The CPR acquired several smaller railways via long-term leases in 1912. On 3 January 1912, the CPR acquired the Dominion Atlantic Railway, a railway that ran in western Nova Scotia. This acquisition gave the CPR a connection to Halifax, a significant port on the Atlantic Ocean. The Dominion Atlantic was isolated from the rest of the CPR network and used the CNR to facilitate interchange; the DAR also operated ferry services across the Bay of Fundy for passengers and cargo (but not rail cars) from the port of Digby, Nova Scotia, to the CPR at Saint John, New Brunswick. DAR steamships also provided connections for passengers and cargo between Yarmouth, Boston and New York. On 1 July 1912, the CPR acquired the Esquimalt and Nanaimo Railway, a railway on Vancouver Island that connected to the CPR using a railcar ferry. The CPR acquired the Quebec Central Railway on 14 December 1912.

During the late 19th century, the railway undertook an ambitious programme of hotel construction, building Glacier House in Glacier National Park, Mount Stephen House at Field, British Columbia, the Château Frontenac in Quebec City and the Banff Springs Hotel. By then, the CPR had competition from three other transcontinental lines, all of them money-losers. In 1919, these lines were consolidated, along with the track of the old Intercolonial Railway and its spurs, into the government-owned Canadian National Railways. The CPR suffered its greatest loss of life when one of its steamships, the Empress of Ireland, sank after a collision with the Norwegian collier SS Storstad. On 29 May 1914, the Empress (operated by the CPR's Canadian Pacific Steamship Company) went down in the St. Lawrence River with the loss of 1,024 lives, of which 840 were passengers.

First World War
During the First World War CPR put the entire resources of the "world's greatest travel system" at the disposal of the British Empire, not only trains and tracks, but also its ships, shops, hotels, telegraphs and, above all, its people. Aiding the war effort meant transporting and billeting troops; building and supplying arms and munitions; arming, lending and selling ships. Fifty-two CPR ships were pressed into service during World War I, carrying more than a million troops and passengers and four million tons of cargo. Twenty seven survived and returned to CPR. CPR also helped the war effort with money and jobs. CPR made loans and guarantees to the Allies of some $100 million. As a lasting tribute, CPR commissioned three statues and 23 memorial tablets to commemorate the efforts of those who fought and those who died in the war. After the war, the Federal government created Canadian National Railways (CNR, later CN) out of several bankrupt railways that fell into government hands during and after the war. CNR would become the main competitor to the CPR in Canada. In 1923, Henry Worth Thornton replaced David Blyth Hanna becoming the second president of the CNR, and his competition spurred Edward Wentworth Beatty, the first Canadian-born president of the CPR, to action. During this time the railway land grants were formalized.

Great Depression and the Second World War, 1929–1945

The Great Depression, which lasted from 1929 until 1939, hit many companies heavily. While the CPR was affected, it was not affected to the extent of its rival CNR because it, unlike the CNR, was debt-free. The CPR scaled back on some of its passenger and freight services, and stopped issuing dividends to its shareholders after 1932. Hard times led to the creation of new political parties such as the Social Credit movement and the Cooperative Commonwealth Federation, as well as popular protest in the form of the On-to-Ottawa Trek.

One highlight of the late 1930s, both for the railway and for Canada, was the visit of King George VI and Queen Elizabeth during their 1939 royal tour of Canada, the first time that the reigning monarch had visited the country. The CPR and the CNR shared the honours of pulling the royal train across the country, with the CPR undertaking the westbound journey from Quebec City to Vancouver. Later that year, the Second World War began. As it had done in World War I, the CPR devoted much of its resources to the war effort. It retooled its Angus Shops in Montreal to produce Valentine tanks and other armoured vehicles, and transported troops and resources across the country. As well, 22 of the CPR's ships went to war, 12 of which were sunk.

1946–1978

After the Second World War, the transportation industry in Canada changed. Where railways had previously provided almost universal freight and passenger services, cars, trucks and airplanes started to take traffic away from railways. This naturally helped the CPR's air and trucking operations, and the railway's freight operations continued to thrive hauling resource traffic and bulk commodities. However, passenger trains quickly became unprofitable. During the 1950s, the railway introduced new innovations in passenger service. In 1955, it introduced The Canadian, a new luxury transcontinental train. However, in the 1960s, the company started to pull out of passenger services, ending services on many of its branch lines. It also discontinued its secondary transcontinental train The Dominion in 1966, and in 1970, unsuccessfully applied to discontinue The Canadian. For the next eight years, it continued to apply to discontinue the service, and service on The Canadian declined markedly. On 29 October 1978, CP Rail transferred its passenger services to Via Rail, a new federal Crown corporation that is responsible for managing all intercity passenger service formerly handled by both CP Rail and CN. Via eventually took almost all of its passenger trains, including The Canadian, off CP's lines.

In 1968, as part of a corporate reorganization, each of the major operations, including its rail operations, were organized as separate subsidiaries. The name of the railway was changed to CP Rail, and the parent company changed its name to Canadian Pacific Limited in 1971. Its air, express, telecommunications, hotel and real estate holdings were spun off, and ownership of all of the companies transferred to Canadian Pacific Investments. The slogan was: "TO THE FOUR CORNERS OF THE WORLD" The company discarded its beaver logo, adopting the new Multimark (which, when mirrored by an adjacent "multi-mark" creates a diamond appearance on a globe) that was used – with a different colour background – for each of its operations.

1979–2001

The 1979 Mississauga train derailment 
On 10 November 1979, a derailment of a hazardous materials train in Mississauga, Ontario, led to the evacuation of 200,000 people; there were no fatalities. Hazel McCallion threatened to sue Canadian Pacific for the derailment. Part of the compromise was to accept GO Transit commuter rail service along the Galt Subdivision corridor up to Milton, Ontario. Limited trains ran along the Milton line on weekdays only. Expansions to Cambridge, Ontario may be coming in the future.

In 1984, CP Rail commenced construction of the Mount Macdonald Tunnel to augment the Connaught Tunnel under the Selkirk Mountains. The first revenue train passed through the tunnel in 1988. At 14.7 km (nine miles), it is the longest tunnel in the Americas. During the 1980s, the Soo Line Railroad, in which CP Rail still owned a controlling interest, underwent several changes. It acquired the Minneapolis, Northfield and Southern Railway in 1982. Then on 21 February 1985, the Soo Line obtained a controlling interest in the bankrupt Milwaukee Road, merging it into its system on 1 January 1986. Also in 1980, Canadian Pacific bought out the controlling interests of the Toronto, Hamilton and Buffalo Railway (TH&B) from Conrail and molded it into the Canadian Pacific System, dissolving the TH&B's name from the books in 1985. In 1987, most of CPR's trackage in the Great Lakes region, including much of the original Soo Line, were spun off into a new railway, the Wisconsin Central, which was subsequently purchased by CN. Influenced by the Canada-U.S. Free Trade Agreement of 1989, which liberalized trade between the two nations, the CPR's expansion continued during the early 1990s: CP Rail gained full control of the Soo Line in 1990, and bought the Delaware and Hudson Railway in 1991. These two acquisitions gave CP Rail routes to the major American cities of Chicago (via the Soo Line and Milwaukee Road as part of its historically logical route) and New York City (via the D&H).

During the 1990s, both CP Rail and CN attempted unsuccessfully to buy out the eastern assets of the other, so as to permit further rationalization. In 1996, CP Rail moved its head office from Windsor Station in Montreal to Gulf Canada Square in Calgary and changed its name back to Canadian Pacific Railway.

A new subsidiary company, the St. Lawrence and Hudson Railway, was created to operate its money-losing lines in eastern North America, covering Quebec, Southern and Eastern Ontario, trackage rights to Chicago, Illinois, (on Norfolk Southern lines from Detroit) as well as the Delaware and Hudson Railway in the northeastern United States. However, the new subsidiary, threatened with being sold off and free to innovate, quickly spun off money-losing track to short lines, instituted scheduled freight service, and produced an unexpected turn-around in profitability. On 1 January 2001 the StL&H was formally amalgamated with the CP Rail system.

2001 to present
In 2001, the CPR's parent company, Canadian Pacific Limited, spun off its five subsidiaries, including the CPR, into independent companies. Most of the company's non-railway businesses at the time of the split were operated by a separate subsidiary called Canadian Pacific Limited. Canadian Pacific Railway formally (but, not legally) shortened its name to Canadian Pacific in early 2007, dropping the word "railway" in order to reflect more operational flexibility. Shortly after the name revision, Canadian Pacific announced that it had committed to becoming a major sponsor and logistics provider to the 2010 Olympic Winter Games in Vancouver.

On 4 September 2007, CPR announced it was acquiring the Dakota, Minnesota and Eastern Railroad from London-based Electra Private Equity. The transaction was an "end-to-end" consolidation and gave CPR access to United States shippers of agricultural products, ethanol and coal. CPR stated its intention to use this purchase to gain access to the rich coalfields of Wyoming's Powder River Basin. The transaction was subject to approval of the U.S. Surface Transportation Board (STB), which was expected to take about a year. On 4 October 2007, CPR announced that it had completed financial transactions required for the acquisition, placing the DM&E and IC&E in a voting trust with Richard Hamlin appointed as trustee. The merger was completed as of 31 October 2008.

In 2010, four repainted Canadian Pacific AC4400CWs were used in the filming of the movie Unstoppable.

On 28 October 2011, in a Schedule 13D filing, the U.S. hedge fund Pershing Square Capital Management (PSCM) indicated it owned 12.2 percent of Canadian Pacific. PSCM began acquiring Canadian Pacific shares in 2011. The stake eventually increased to 14.2 percent, making PSCM the railway's largest shareholder. At a meeting with the company that month, Pershing's head Bill Ackman proposed replacing Fred Green as CP's chief executive. Just hours before the railway's annual shareholder meeting on Thursday, 17 May 2012, Green and five other board members, including chairman John Cleghorn, resigned. The seven nominees, including Ackman and his partner, Paul Hilal, were then elected. The reconstituted board, having named Stephen Tobias (former vice president and chief operating officer of Norfolk Southern Railroad) as interim CEO, initiated a search for a new CEO, eventually settling on E. Hunter Harrison, former president of Canadian National Railway, on 29 June 2012.

Canadian Pacific Railway Ltd. trains resumed regular operations on 1 June 2012 after a nine-day strike by some 4,800 locomotive engineers, conductors and traffic controllers who walked off the job on 23 May, stalling Canadian freight traffic and costing the economy an estimated . The strike ended with a government back-to-work bill forcing both sides to come to a binding agreement.

On 6 July 2013, a unit train of crude oil which CP had subcontracted to short-line operator Montreal, Maine and Atlantic Railway derailed in Lac-Mégantic, killing 47. On 14 August 2013, the Quebec government added the CPR, along with lessor World Fuel Services (WFS), to the list of corporate entities from which it seeks reimbursement for the environmental cleanup of the Lac-Mégantic derailment. On 15 July, the press reported that CP would appeal the legal order. Railway spokesman Ed Greenberg stated "Canadian Pacific has reviewed the notice. As a matter of fact, in law, CP is not responsible for this cleanup." In February 2014, Harrison called for immediate action to phase-out DOT-111 tank cars, known to be more dangerous in cases of derailment.

On 12 October 2014 it was reported that Canadian Pacific had tried to enter into a merger with American railway CSX, but was unsuccessful.

In 2015–16 Canadian Pacific sought to merge with American railway Norfolk Southern. and wanted to have a shareholder vote on it. Canadian Pacific created a website to persuade people that the Canadian Pacific/Norfolk Southern merger would benefit the rail industry. However, this proposed merger would come under scrutiny by the U.S. Department of Justice over antitrust concerns created by the proposed merger. Canadian Pacific filed a complaint against the U.S. DOJ and dropped their proposed proxy fight in the proposed merger with Norfolk Southern. The proposed merger was also opposed by rival freight company, the United Parcel Service (UPS), who spoke out about the rail merger and said they were against the Canadian Pacific/Norfolk Southern merger. CP ultimately terminated its efforts to merge on 11 April 2016.

On 18 January 2017 it was announced that Hunter Harrison was retiring from CP and that Keith Creel would become president and chief executive officer of the company effective 31 January 2017.

On 4 February 2019, a loaded grain train ran away from the siding at Partridge just above the Upper Spiral Tunnel in Kicking Horse Pass. The 112-car grain train with three locomotives derailed into the Kicking Horse River just after the Trans Canada Highway overpass. The three crew members on the lead locomotive were killed. The Canadian Pacific Police Service (CPPS) investigated the fatal derailment. It later came to light that, although Creel said that the RCMP "retain jurisdiction" over the investigation, the RCMP wrote that "it never had jurisdiction because the crash happened on CP property". On 26 January 2020, Canadian current affairs program The Fifth Estate broadcast an episode on the derailment, and the next day the Canadian Transportation Safety Board (TSB) called for the RCMP to investigate as lead investigator Don Crawford said, "There is enough to suspect there's negligence here and it needs to be investigated by the proper authority".

On 4 February 2020, the TSB demoted its lead investigator in the crash probe after his superiors decided these comments were "completely inappropriate". The TSB stated that it "does not share the view of the lead safety investigator". The CPPS say they did a thorough investigation into the actions of the crew, which is now closed and resulted in no charges, while the Alberta Federation of Labour and the Teamsters Canada Rail Conference called for an independent police probe.

On 20 November 2019, it was announced that Canadian Pacific would purchase the Central Maine and Quebec Railway from Fortress Transportation and Infrastructure Investors. The line had had a series of different owners since being spun off of the Canadian Pacific in 1995. The first operator was the Canadian American Railroad a division of Iron Road Railways. In 2002 the Montreal, Maine & Atlantic took over operations after CDAC declared bankruptcy. The Central, Maine and Quebec Railway started operations in 2014 after the MMA declared bankruptcy due to the Lac-Mégantic derailment. On this new acquisition, CP CEO Keith Creel remarked that this gives CP a true coast-to-coast network across Canada and an increased presence in New England. On June 4, 2020; Canadian Pacific bought the Central Maine and Quebec.

Merger with Kansas City Southern (2021–2023) 
On March 21, 2021, CP announced that it was planning to purchase the Kansas City Southern Railway (KCS) for US$29 billion. The US Surface Transportation Board (STB) would first have to approve the purchase, which was expected to be completed by the middle of 2022.

However, a competing cash and stock offer was later made by Canadian National Railway (CN) on April 20 at $33.7 billion. On May 13, KCS announced that they planned to accept the merger offer from CN, but would give CP until May 21 to come up with a higher bid. On May 21, KCS and CN agreed to a merger. However, CN's merger attempt was blocked by a STB ruling in August that the company could not use a voting trust to assume control of KCS, due to concerns about potentially reduced competition in the railroad industry.

On September 12, KCS accepted a new $31 billion offer from CP. Though CP's offer was lower than the offer made by CN, the STB permitted CP to use a voting trust to take control of KCS.  The voting trust allowed CP to become the beneficial owner of KCS in December, but the two railroads operated independently until receiving approval for a merger of operations from the STB. That approval came on March 15, 2023, which permitted the railroads to merge as soon as April 14. Post merger, the combined railroad will rebrand under a new name: Canadian Pacific Kansas City, or CPKC.

Freight trains

Over half of CP's freight traffic is in grain (24% of 2016 freight revenue), intermodal freight (22%), and coal (10%) and the vast majority of its profits are made in western Canada. A major shift in trade from the Atlantic to the Pacific has caused serious drops in CPR's wheat shipments through Thunder Bay. It also ships chemicals and plastics (12% of 2016 revenue), automotive parts and assembled automobiles (6%), potash (6%), sulphur and other fertilizers (5%), forest products (5%), and various other products (11%). The busiest part of its railway network is along its main line between Calgary and Vancouver. Since 1970, coal has become a major commodity hauled by CPR. Coal is shipped in unit trains from coal mines in the mountains, most notably Sparwood, British Columbia, to terminals at Roberts Bank and North Vancouver, from where it is then shipped to Japan.

Grain is hauled by the CPR from the prairies to ports at Thunder Bay (the former cities of Fort William and Port Arthur), Quebec City and Vancouver, where it is then shipped overseas. The traditional winter export port was Saint John, New Brunswick, when ice closed the St. Lawrence River. Grain has always been a significant commodity hauled by the CPR; between 1905 and 1909, the CPR double-tracked its section of track between Fort William, Ontario (part of present-day Thunder Bay) and Winnipeg to facilitate grain shipments. For several decades this was the only long stretch of double-track mainline outside of urban areas on the CPR. Today, though the Thunder Bay-Winnipeg section is now single tracked, the CPR still has two long distance double track lines serving rural areas, including a  stretch between Kent, British Columbia, and Vancouver which follows the Fraser River into the Coast Mountains, as well as the Canadian Pacific Winchester Sub, a  stretch of double track mainline which runs from Smiths Falls, Ontario, through downtown Montreal which runs through many rural farming communities. However, CPR is in the midst of partially dismantling the stretch of double track mainline on the Winchester Sub. There are also various long stretches of double track between Golden and Kamloops, British Columbia, and portions of the original Winnipeg-Thunder Bay double track (such as  through Kenora and Keewatin, Ontario) are still double track.

Passenger trains
The train was the primary mode of long-distance transport in Canada until the 1960s. Among the many types of people who rode CPR trains were new immigrants heading for the prairies, military troops (especially during the two world wars) and upper class tourists. It also custom-built many of its passenger cars at its CPR Angus Shops to be able to meet the demands of the upper class.

The CPR also had a line of Great Lakes ships integrated into its transcontinental service. From 1885 until 1912, these ships linked Owen Sound on Georgian Bay to Fort William. Following a major fire in December 1911 that destroyed the grain elevator, operations were relocated to a new, larger port created by the CPR at Port McNicoll opening in May 1912. Five ships allowed daily service, and included the S.S. Assiniboia and S.S. Keewatin built in 1908 which remained in use until the end of service. Travellers went by train from Toronto to that Georgian Bay port, then travelled by ship to link with another train at the Lakehead. After World War II, the trains and ships carried automobiles as well as passengers. This service featured what was to become the last boat train in North America. The Steam Boat was a fast, direct connecting train between Toronto and Port McNicoll. The passenger service was discontinued at the end of season in 1965 with one ship, the Keewatin, carrying on in freight service for two more years. It later became a marine museum at Douglas, Michigan, in the United States, before returning to its original homeport of Port McNicoll, Canada in 2013.

After the Second World War, passenger traffic declined as automobiles and airplanes became more common, but the CPR continued to innovate in an attempt to keep passenger numbers up. Beginning 9 November 1953, the CPR introduced Budd Rail Diesel Cars (RDCs) on many of its lines. Officially called "Dayliners" by the CPR, they were always referred to as Budd Cars by employees. Greatly reduced travel times and reduced costs resulted, which saved service on many lines for a number of years. The CPR went on to acquire the second largest fleet of RDCs totalling 52 cars. Only the Boston and Maine Railroad had more. This CPR fleet also included the rare model RDC-4 (which consisted of a mail section at one end and a baggage section at the other end with no formal passenger section). On 24 April 1955, the CPR introduced a new luxury transcontinental passenger train, The Canadian. The train provided service between Vancouver and Toronto or Montreal (east of Sudbury; the train was in two sections). The train, which operated on an expedited schedule, was pulled by diesel locomotives, and used new, streamlined, stainless steel rolling stock. This service was initially heavily promoted by the company and many images of the train, especially as it traversed the Canadian Rockies, were captured by CPR's official photographer Nicholas Morant. Featured in numerous advertising promotions worldwide, several such images have gained iconic status.

Starting in the 1960s, however, the railway started to discontinue much of its passenger service, particularly on its branch lines. For example, passenger service ended on its line through southern British Columbia and Crowsnest Pass in January 1964, and on its Quebec Central in April 1967, and the transcontinental train The Dominion was dropped in January 1966. On 29 October 1978, CP Rail transferred its passenger services to Via Rail, a new federal Crown corporation that was now responsible for intercity passenger services in Canada. Canadian Prime Minister Brian Mulroney presided over major cuts in Via Rail service on 15 January 1990. This ended service by The Canadian over CPR rails, and the train was rerouted on the former Super Continental route via Canadian National without a change of name. Where both trains had been daily prior to the 15 January 1990 cuts, the surviving Canadian was only a three-times-weekly operation. In October 2012, The Canadian was reduced to twice-weekly for the six-month off-season period, and currently operates three-times-weekly for only six months a year. In addition to inter-city passenger services, the CPR also provided commuter rail services in Montreal. CP Rail introduced Canada's first bi-level passenger cars here in 1970. On 1 October 1982, the Montreal Urban Community Transit Commission (STCUM) assumed responsibility for the commuter services previously provided by CP Rail. It continues under the Metropolitan Transportation Agency (AMT).

Canadian Pacific Railway currently operates two commuter services under contract. GO Transit contracts CPR to operate six return trips between Milton and central Toronto in Ontario. In Montreal, 59 daily commuter trains run on CPR lines from Lucien-L'Allier Station to Candiac, Hudson and Blainville–Saint-Jérôme on behalf of the AMT. CP no longer operates Vancouver's West Coast Express on behalf of TransLink, a regional transit authority. Bombardier Transportation assumed control of train operations on 5 May 2014. Although CP Rail no longer owns the track nor operates the commuter trains, it handles dispatching of Metra trains on the Milwaukee District/North and Milwaukee District/West Lines in Chicago, on which the CP also provides freight service via trackage rights.

Sleeping, Dining and Parlour Car Department
Sleeping cars were operated by a separate department of the railway that included the dining and parlour cars and aptly named as the Sleeping, Dining and Parlour Car Department. The CPR decided from the very beginning that it would operate its own sleeping cars, unlike railways in the United States that depended upon independent companies that specialized in providing cars and porters, including building the cars themselves. Pullman was long a famous name in this regard; its Pullman porters were legendary. Other early companies included the Wagner Palace Car Company. Bigger-sized berths and more comfortable surroundings were built by order of the CPR's General Manager, William Van Horne, who was a large man himself. Providing and operating their own cars allowed better control of the service provided as well as keeping all of the revenue received, although dining-car services were never profitable. But railway managers realized that those who could afford to travel great distances expected such facilities, and their favourable opinion would bode well to attracting others to Canada and the CPR's trains.

Express
W. C. Van Horne decided from the very beginning that the CPR would retain as much revenue from its various operations as it could. This translated into keeping express, telegraph, sleeping car and other lines of business for themselves, creating separate departments or companies as necessary. This was necessary as the fledgling railway would need all the income it could get, and in addition, he saw some of these ancillary operations such as express and telegraph as being quite profitable. Others such as sleeping and dining cars were kept in order to provide better control over the quality of service being provided to passengers. Hotels were likewise crucial to the CPR's growth by attracting travellers.

It was soon absorbed into the CPR and expanded everywhere the CPR went. It was renamed Canadian Express Company on 1 September 1926, and the headquarters moved from Winnipeg, to Toronto. It was operated as a separate company with the railway charging them to haul express cars on trains. Express was handled in separate cars, some with employees on board, on the headend of passenger trains to provide a fast scheduled service for which higher rates could be charged than for LCL (Less than Carload Lot), small shipments of freight which were subject to delay. Aside from all sorts of small shipments for all kinds of businesses such products as cream, butter, poultry and eggs were handled along with fresh flowers, fish and other sea foods some handled in separate refrigerated cars. Horses and livestock along with birds and small animals including prize cattle for exhibition were carried often in special horse cars that had facilities for grooms to ride with their animals.

Automobiles for individuals were also handled by express in closed boxcars. Gold and silver bullion as well as cash were carried in large amounts between the mint and banks and Express messengers were armed for security. Small business money shipments and valuables such as jewellery were routinely handled in small packets. Money orders and travellers' cheques were an important part of the express company's business and were used worldwide in the years before credit cards. Canadian Express Cartage Department was formed in March 1937 to handle pickup and delivery of most express shipments including less-than-carload freight. Their trucks were painted Killarney (dark) green while regular express company vehicles were painted bright red. Express routes using highway trucks beginning in November 1945 in southern Ontario and Alberta co-ordinated railway and highway service expanded service to better serve smaller locations especially on branchlines. Trucking operations would go on to expand across Canada making it an important transport provider for small shipments. Deregulation in the 1980s, however, changed everything and trucking services were ended  after many attempts to change with the times.

Special trains

Silk trains
Between the 1890s and 1933, the CPR transported raw silk from Vancouver, where it had been shipped from the Orient, to silk mills in New York and New Jersey. A silk train could carry several million dollars' worth of silk, so they had their own armed guards. To avoid train robberies and so minimize insurance costs, they travelled quickly and stopped only to change locomotives and crews, which was often done in under five minutes. The silk trains had superior rights over all other trains; even passenger trains (including the Royal Train of 1939) would be put in sidings to make the silk trains' trip faster. At the end of World War II, the invention of nylon made silk less valuable, so the silk trains died out.

Funeral trains

Funeral trains would carry the remains of important people, such as prime ministers. As the train would pass, mourners would be at certain spots to show respect. Two of the CPR's funeral trains are particularly well-known. On 10 June 1891, the funeral train of Prime Minister Sir John A. Macdonald ran from Ottawa to Kingston, Ontario. The train consisted of five heavily draped passenger cars and was pulled by 4-4-0 No. 283. On 14 September 1915, the funeral train of former CPR president Sir William Cornelius Van Horne ran from Montreal to Joliet, Illinois, pulled by 4-6-2 No. 2213.

Royal trains

The CPR ran a number of trains that transported members of the Canadian royal family when they toured the country, taking them through Canada's scenery, forests, and small towns, and enabling people to see and greet them. Their trains were elegantly decorated; some had amenities such as a post office and barber shop. The CPR's most notable royal train was in 1939, when the CPR and the CNR had the honour of carrying King George VI and Queen Elizabeth during their coast-to-coast-and-back tour of Canada; one company took the royal couple from Quebec City to Vancouver and the other company took them on the return journey to Halifax. This was the first tour of Canada by its reigning monarch. The steam locomotives used to pull the train included CPR 2850, a Hudson (4-6-4) built by Montreal Locomotive Works in 1938, CNR 6400, a U-4-a Northern (4-8-4) and CNR 6028 a U-1-b Mountain (4-8-2) type. They were specially painted royal blue, with the exception of CNR 6028 which was not painted, with silver trim as was the entire train. The King, somewhat of a railbuff, rode in the cab when possible. After the tour, King George gave the CPR permission to use the term "Royal Hudson" for the CPR locomotives and to display Royal Crowns on their running boards. This applied only to the semi-streamlined locomotives (2820–2864), not the "standard" Hudsons (2800–2819).

Better Farming Train
CPR provided the rolling stock for the Better Farming Train which toured rural Saskatchewan between 1914 and 1922 to promote the latest information on agricultural research. It was staffed by the University of Saskatchewan and operating expenses were covered by the Department of Agriculture.

School cars
Between 1927 and the early 1950s, the CPR ran a school car to reach children who lived in Northern Ontario, far from schools. A teacher would travel in a specially designed car to remote areas and would stay to teach in one area for two to three days, then leave for another area. Each car had a blackboard and a few sets of chairs and desks. They also contained miniature libraries and accommodation for the teacher.

Silver Streak
Major shooting for the 1976 film Silver Streak, a fictional comedy tale of a murder-ridden train trip from Los Angeles to Chicago, was done on the CPR, mainly in the Alberta area with station footage at Toronto's Union Station. The train set was so lightly disguised as the fictional "AMRoad" that the locomotives and cars still carried their original names and numbers, along with the easily identifiable CP Rail red-striped paint scheme. Most of the cars are still in revenue service on Via Rail Canada; the lead locomotive (CP 4070) and the second unit (CP 4067) were sold to Via Rail and CTCUM respectively.

Holiday Train

Starting in 1999, CP runs a Holiday Train along its main line during the months of November and December. The Holiday Train celebrates the holiday season and collects donations for community food banks and hunger issues. The Holiday Train also provides publicity for CP and a few of its customers. Each train has a box car stage for entertainers who are travelling along with the train.

The train is a freight train, but also pulls vintage passenger cars which are used as lodging/transportation for the crew and entertainers. Only entertainers and CP employees are allowed to board the train aside from a coach car that takes employees and their families from one stop to the next. All donations collected in a community remain in that community for distribution.

There are two Holiday Trains that cover 150 stops in Canada and the United States Northeast and Midwest. They are each decorated with hundred of thousands of LED Christmas lights. In 2013 to celebrate the program's 15th year, three signature events were held in Hamilton, Ontario, Calgary, Alberta, and Cottage Grove, Minnesota, to further raise awareness for hunger issues.

The trains feature different entertainers each year; in 2016, one train featured Dallas Smith and the Odds, while the other featured Colin James and Kelly Prescott.

Royal Canadian Pacific
On 7 June 2000, the CPR inaugurated the Royal Canadian Pacific, a luxury excursion service that operates between the months of June and September. It operates along a  route from Calgary, through the Columbia Valley in British Columbia, and returning to Calgary via Crowsnest Pass. The trip takes six days and five nights. The train consists of up to eight luxury passenger cars built between 1916 and 1931 and is powered by first-generation diesel locomotives.

Steam train

In 1998, the CPR repatriated one of its former passenger steam locomotives that had been on static display in the United States following its sale in January 1964, long after the close of the steam era. CPR Hudson 2816 was re-designated Empress 2816 following a 30-month restoration that cost in excess of $1 million. It was subsequently returned to service to promote public relations. It has operated across much of the CPR system, including lines in the U.S. and been used for various charitable purposes; 100% of the money raised goes to the nationwide charity Breakfast for Learning — the CPR bears all of the expenses associated with the operation of the train. 2816 is the subject of Rocky Mountain Express, a 2011 IMAX film which follows the locomotive on an eastbound journey beginning in Vancouver, and which tells the story of the building of the CPR. 2816 has been stored indefinitely since 2012 after CEO E. Hunter Harrison discontinued the steam program.

The locomotive was fired up on November 13, 2020, for a steam test and moved around the Ogden campus yard.  At the time, CP only had plans to utilize the locomotive for a special Holiday Train at Home broadcast, after which it was put in storage. However, in mid 2021, CEO Keith Creel announced intentions to bring 2816 back to full operational status, for a tour from their Calgary headquarters to Mexico City, if the merger with Kansas City Southern Railway is approved by the Surface Transportation Board in the United States.  Work on the needed overhaul began in earnest in late 2021 for a planned date in 2023.

Spirit Train
In 2008, Canadian Pacific partnered with the 2010 Olympic and Paralympic Winter Games to present a "Spirit Train" tour that featured Olympic-themed events at various stops. Colin James was a headline entertainer. Several stops were met by protesters who argued that the games were slated to take place on stolen indigenous land.

CP Canada 150 Train 
In 2017, CP ran the CP Canada 150 Train from Port Moody to Ottawa to celebrate Canada's 150th year since Confederation. The train stopped in 13 cities along its 3-week summer tour, offering a free block party and concert from Dean Brody, Kelly Prescott and Dallas Arcand. The heritage train drew out thousands to sign the special "Spirit of Tomorrow" car, where children were invited to write their wishes for the future of Canada and send them to Ottawa. Prime Minister Justin Trudeau and daughter Ella-Grace Trudeau also visited the train and rode it from Revelstoke to Calgary.

Non-railway services
Historically, Canadian Pacific operated several non-railway businesses. In 1971, these businesses were split off into the separate company Canadian Pacific Limited, and in 2001, that company was further split into five companies. CP no longer provides any of these services.

Telegraph
The original charter of the CPR granted in 1881 provided for the right to create an electric telegraph and telephone service including charging for it. The telephone had barely been invented but telegraph was well established as a means of communicating quickly across great distances. Being allowed to sell this service meant the railway could offset the costs of constructing and maintaining a pole line along its tracks across vast distances for its own purposes which were largely for dispatching trains. It began doing so in 1882 as the separate Telegraph Department. It would go on to provide a link between the cables under the Atlantic and Pacific oceans when they were completed. Before the CPR line, messages to the west could be sent only via the United States.

Paid for by the word, the telegram was an expensive way to send messages, but they were vital to businesses. An individual receiving a personal telegram was seen as being someone important except for those that transmitted sorrow in the form of death notices. Messengers on bicycles delivered telegrams and picked up a reply in cities. In smaller locations, the local railway station agent would handle this on a commission basis. To speed things, at the local end messages would first be telephoned. In 1931, it became the Communications Department in recognition of the expanding services provided which included telephones lines, news wire, ticker quotations for capital stocks and eventually teleprinters. All were faster than mail and very important to business and the public alike for many decades before mobile phones and computers came along. It was the coming of these newer technologies especially cellular telephones that eventually resulted in the demise of these services even after formation in 1967 of CN-CP Telecommunications in an effort to effect efficiencies through consolidation rather than competition. Deregulation in the 1980s, brought about mergers and the sale of remaining services and facilities.

Radio
On 17 January 1930, the CPR applied for licences to operate radio stations in 11 cities from coast-to-coast for the purpose of organising its own radio network in order to compete with the CNR Radio service. The CNR had built a radio network with the aim of promoting itself as well as entertaining its passengers during their travels. The onset of the Great Depression hurt the CPR's financial plan for a rival project and in April they withdrew their applications for stations in all but Toronto, Montreal and Winnipeg. CPR did not end up pursuing these applications but instead operated a phantom station in Toronto known as "CPRY," with initials standing for "Canadian Pacific Royal York" which operated out of studios at CP's Royal York Hotel and leased time on CFRB and CKGW. A network of affiliates carried the CPR radio network's broadcasts in the first half of the 1930s, but the takeover of CNR's Radio service by the new Canadian Radio Broadcasting Commission removed CPR's need to have a network for competitive reasons and CPR's radio service was discontinued in 1935.

CPR programming included a series of concert broadcasts from Montreal with an orchestra conducted by Douglas Clarke and a series called Concert Orchestra broadcast from the Royal York Hotel featuring conductor Rex Battle, and another series of concerts, this time sponsored by Imperial Oil and featuring conductor Reginald Stewart with a 55-piece orchestra and some of the leading soloists of the day, also performing at the Royal York.

Steamships

Steamships played an important part in the history of CP from the very earliest days. During construction of the line in British Columbia even before the private CPR took over from the government contractor, ships were used to bring supplies to the construction sites. Similarly, to reach the isolated area of Superior in northern Ontario ships were used to bring in supplies to the construction work. While this work was going on there was already regular passenger service to the West. Trains operated from Toronto to Owen Sound where CPR steamships connected to Fort William where trains once again operated to reach Winnipeg. Before the CPR was completed the only way to reach the West was through the United States via St. Paul and Winnipeg. This Great Lakes steam ship service continued as an alternative route for many years and was always operated by the railway. Canadian Pacific passenger service on the lakes ended in 1965.

In 1884, CPR began purchasing sailing ships as part of a railway supply service on the Great Lakes. Over time, CPR became a railway company with widely organized water transportation auxiliaries including the Great Lakes service, the trans-Pacific service, the Pacific coastal service, the British Columbia lake and river service, the trans-Atlantic service and the Bay of Fundy Ferry service. In the 20th century, the company evolved into an intercontinental railway which operated two transoceanic services which connected Canada with Europe and with Asia. The range of CPR services were aspects of an integrated plan.

Once the railway was completed to British Columbia, the CPR chartered and soon bought their own passenger steamships as a link to the Orient. These sleek steamships were of the latest design and christened with "Empress" names (e. g., RMS Empress of Britain, Empress of Canada, Empress of Australia, and so forth). Travel to and from the Orient and cargo, especially imported tea and silk, were an important source of revenue, aided by Royal Mail contracts. This was an important part of the All-Red Route linking the various parts of the British Empire.

The other ocean part was the Atlantic service to and from the United Kingdom, which began with acquisition of two existing lines, Beaver Line, owned by Elder Dempster and Allan Lines. These two segments became Canadian Pacific Ocean Services (later, Canadian Pacific Steamships) and operated separately from the various lake services operated in Canada, which were considered to be a direct part of the railway's operations. These trans-ocean routes made it possible to travel from Britain to Hong Kong using only the CPR's ships, trains and hotels. CP's 'Empress' ships became world-famous for their luxury and speed. They had a practical role, too, in transporting immigrants from much of Europe to Canada, especially to populate the vast prairies. They also played an important role in both world wars with many of them being lost to enemy action, including Empress of Britain.

There were also a number of rail ferries operated over the years as well including, between Windsor, Ontario, and Detroit from 1890 until 1915. This began with two paddle-wheelers capable of carrying 16 cars. Passenger cars were carried as well as freight. This service ended in 1915 when the CPR made an agreement with the Michigan Central to use their Detroit River tunnel opened in 1910. Pennsylvania-Ontario Transportation Company was formed jointly with the PRR in 1906 to operate a ferry across Lake Erie between Ashtabula, Ohio, and Port Burwell, Ontario, to carry freight cars, mostly of coal, much of it to be burned in CPR steam locomotives. Only one ferry boat was ever operated, Ashtabula, a large vessel which eventually sank in a harbour collision in Ashtabula on 18 September 1958, thus ending the service.

Canadian Pacific Car and Passenger Transfer Company was formed by other interest in 1888 linking the CPR in Prescott, Ontario, and the NYC in Ogdensburg, New York. Service on this route had actually begun very early, in 1854, along with service from Brockville. A bridge built in 1958 ended passenger service however, freight continued until Ogdensburg's dock was destroyed by fire 25 September 1970, thus ending all service. CPC&PTC was never owned by the CPR. Bay of Fundy ferry service was operated for passengers and freight for many years linking Digby, Nova Scotia, and Saint John, New Brunswick. Eventually, after 78 years, with the changing times the scheduled passenger services would all be ended as well as ocean cruises. Cargo would continue on both oceans with a change over to containers. CP was an intermodal pioneer especially on land with road and railway mixing to provide the best service. CP Ships was the final operation, and in the end it too left CP ownership when it was spun off in 2001. CP Ships was merged with Hapag-Lloyd in 2005.

British Columbia Coast Steamships
The Canadian Pacific Railway Coast Service (British Columbia Coast Steamships or BCCS) was established when the CPR acquired in 1901 Canadian Pacific Navigation Company (no relation) and its large fleet of ships that served 72 ports along the coast of British Columbia including on Vancouver Island. Service included the Vancouver-Victoria-Seattle Triangle Route, Gulf Islands, Powell River, as well as Vancouver-Alaska service. BCCS operated a fleet of 14 passenger ships made up of a number of Princess ships, pocket versions of the famous oceangoing Empress ships along with a freighter, three tugs and five railway car barges. Popular with tourists, the Princess ships were famous in their own right especially Princess Marguerite (II) which operated from 1949 until 1985 and was the last coastal liner in operation. The best known of the princess ships, however, is Princess Sophia, which sank with no survivors in October 1918 after striking the Vanderbilt Reef in Alaska's Lynn Canal, constituting the largest maritime disaster in the history of the Pacific Northwest. These services continued for many years until changing conditions in the late 1950s brought about their decline and eventual demise at the end of season in 1974. Princess Marguerite was acquired by the province's British Columbia Steamship (1975) Ltd. and continued to operate for a number of years. In 1977 although BCCSS was the legal name, it was rebranded as Coastal Marine Operations (CMO). By 1998 the company was bought by the Washington Marine Group which after purchase was renamed Seaspan Coastal Intermodal Company and then subsequently rebranded in 2011 as Seaspan Ferries Corporation. Passenger service ended in 1981.

British Columbia Lake and River Service

The Canadian Pacific Railway Lake and River Service (British Columbia Lake and River Service) developed slowly and in spurts of growth. CP began a long history of service in the Kootenays region of southern British Columbia beginning with the purchase in 1897 of the Columbia and Kootenay Steam Navigation Company which operated a fleet of steamers and barges on the Arrow Lakes and was merged into the CPR as the CPR Lake and River Service which also served the Arrow Lakes and Columbia River, Kootenay Lake and Kootenai River, Lake Okanagan and Skaha Lake, Slocan Lake, Trout Lake, and Shuswap Lake and the Thompson River/Kamloops Lake.

All of these lake operations had one thing in common, the need for shallow draft therefore sternwheelers were the choice of ship. Tugs and barges handled railway equipment including one operation that saw the entire train including the locomotive and caboose go along. These services gradually declined and ended in 1975 except for a freight barge on Slocan Lake. This was the one where the entire train went along since the barge was a link to an isolated section of track. The Iris G tug boat and a barge were operated under contract to CP Rail until the last train ran late in December 1988. The sternwheel steamship Moyie on Kootenay Lake was the last CPR passenger boat in BC lake service, having operated from 1898 until 1957. She became a beached historical exhibit, as are also the Sicamous and Naramata at Penticton on Lake Okanagan.

Hotels

To promote tourism and passenger ridership the Canadian Pacific established a series of first class hotels. These hotels became landmarks famous in their own right. They include the Algonquin in St. Andrews, Château Frontenac in Quebec, Royal York in Toronto, Minaki Lodge in Minaki Ontario, Hotel Vancouver, Empress Hotel in Victoria and the Banff Springs Hotel and Chateau Lake Louise in the Canadian Rockies. Several signature hotels were acquired from its competitor Canadian National during the 1980s, including the Jasper Park Lodge. The hotels retain their Canadian Pacific heritage, but are no longer operated by the railway. In 1998, Canadian Pacific Hotels acquired Fairmont Hotels, an American company, becoming Fairmont Hotels and Resorts, Inc.; the combined corporation operated the historic Canadian properties as well as the Fairmont's U.S. properties until merged with Raffles Hotels and Resorts and Swissôtel in 2006.

Airline

Canadian Pacific Airlines, also called CP Air, operated from 1942 to 1987 and was the main competitor of Canadian government-owned Air Canada. Based at Vancouver International Airport, it served Canadian and international routes until it was purchased by Pacific Western Airlines which merged PWA and CP Air to create Canadian Airlines.

Locomotives

Steam locomotives

In the CPR's early years, it made extensive use of American-type 4-4-0 steam locomotives, and such examples of this are the Countess of Dufferin or No. 29. Later, considerable use was also made of the 4-6-0 type for passenger and 2-8-0 type for freight. Starting in the 20th century, the CPR bought and built hundreds of Ten-Wheeler-type 4-6-0s for passenger and freight service and similar quantities of 2-8-0s and 2-10-2s for freight. 2-10-2s were also used in passenger service on mountain routes. The CPR bought hundreds of 4-6-2 Pacifics between 1906 and 1948 with later versions being true dual-purpose passenger and fast-freight locomotives.

The CPR built hundreds of its own locomotives at its shops in Montreal, first at the "New Shops", as the DeLorimer shops were commonly referred to, and at the massive Angus Shops that replaced them in 1904. Some of the CPR's best-known locomotives were the 4-6-4 Hudsons. First built in 1929, they began a new era of modern locomotives with capabilities that changed how transcontinental passenger trains ran, eliminating frequent changes en route.
Especially notable were the semi-streamlined H1 class Royal Hudsons, locomotives that were given their name because one of their class hauled the royal train carrying King George VI and Queen Elizabeth on the 1939 royal tour across Canada without change or failure. That locomotive, No. 2850, is preserved in the Exporail exhibit hall of the Canadian Railway Museum in Saint-Constant, Quebec. One of the class, No. 2860, was restored by the British Columbia government and used in excursion service on the British Columbia Railway between 1974 and 1999.

The CPR also made many of their older 2-8-0s, built in the turn of the century, into 2-8-2s.

In 1929, the CPR received its first 2-10-4 Selkirk locomotives, the largest steam locomotives to run in Canada and the British Empire. Named after the Selkirk Mountains where they served, these locomotives were well suited for steep grades. They were regularly used in passenger and freight service. The CPR would own 37 of these locomotives, including number 8000, an experimental high pressure engine. The last steam locomotives that the CPR received, in 1949, were Selkirks, numbered 5930–5935.

Diesel locomotives

In 1937, the CPR acquired its first diesel-electric locomotive, a custom-built one-of-a-kind switcher numbered 7000. This locomotive was not successful and was not repeated. Production-model diesels were imported from American Locomotive Company (Alco) starting with five model S-2 yard switchers in 1943 and followed by further orders. In 1949, operations on lines in Vermont were dieselized with Alco FA1 road locomotives (eight A and four B units), five ALCO RS-2 road switchers, three Alco S-2 switchers and three EMD E8 passenger locomotives. In 1948 Montreal Locomotive Works began production of ALCO designs.

In 1949, the CPR acquired 13 Baldwin-designed locomotives from the Canadian Locomotive Company for its isolated Esquimalt and Nanaimo Railway and Vancouver Island was quickly dieselized. Following that successful experiment, the CPR started to dieselize its main network. Dieselization was completed 11 years later, with its last steam locomotive running on 6 November 1960. The CPR's first-generation locomotives were mostly made by General Motors Diesel and Montreal Locomotive Works (American Locomotive Company designs), with some made by the Canadian Locomotive Company to Baldwin and Fairbanks Morse designs.

CP was the first railway in North America to pioneer alternating current (AC) traction diesel-electric locomotives in 1984. In 1995, CP turned to GE Transportation for the first production AC traction locomotives in Canada, and now has the highest percentage of AC locomotives in service of all North American Class I railways.

On 16 September 2019, Progress Rail rolled out two SD70ACU rebuilds in Canadian Pacific heritage paint schemes; 7010 wears a Tuscan red and grey paint scheme with script writing, and the 7015 wears a similar paint scheme with block lettering.

On 11 November 2019, five SD70ACU units with commemorative military themes were unveiled during CPR's Remembrance Day ceremony. These units are numbered 7020–7023, with 7024 being renumbered to 6644 to commemorate the date of D-Day: 6 June 1944.

In 2021 Canadian Pacific repainted two locomotives orange: ES44AC 8757 which was unveiled for National Day for Truth and Reconciliation in September 2021, and ES44AC 8781 to commemorate shipper Hapag-Lloyd.

The fleet includes these types:

Active diesel roster

Retired diesel roster

Corporate structure
Canadian Pacific Railway Limited is a Canadian railway transportation company that operates the Canadian Pacific Railway. It was created in 2001 when the CPR's former parent company, Canadian Pacific Limited, spun off its railway operations. On 3 October 2001, the company's shares began to trade on the New York Stock Exchange and the Toronto Stock Exchange under the "CP" symbol. During 2003, the company earned  in freight revenue. In October 2008, Canadian Pacific Railway Ltd was named one of "Canada's Top 100 Employers" by Mediacorp Canada Inc., and was featured in Maclean's. Later that month, CPR was named one of Alberta's Top Employers, which was reported in both the Calgary Herald and the Edmonton Journal.

Presidents

Major facilities

CP owns a large number of large yards and repair shops across their system, which are used for many operations ranging from intermodal terminals to classification yards. Below are some examples of these.

Hump yards
Hump yards work by using a small hill over which cars are pushed, before being released down a slope and switched automatically into cuts of cars, ready to be made into outbound trains. Many of these yards were closed in 2012 and 2013 under Hunter Harrison's company-wide restructuring; only the St. Paul Yard hump remains open.

 Calgary, Alberta –  Alyth Yard; handles 2,200 cars daily (closed)
 Franklin Park, Illinois – Bensenville Yard (closed)
 Montreal, Quebec – St. Luc Yard; active since 1950. Flat switching since the mid-1980s. (closed)
 St. Paul, Minnesota – Pig's Eye Yard / St. Paul Yard
 Toronto, Ontario – Toronto Yard (also known as "Toronto Freight Yard or Agincourt Yard"); opened in 1964
 Winnipeg, Manitoba – Rugby Yard (also known as "Weston Yard") (active)

Aircraft
As of February 2023, Transport Canada lists the following aircraft in its database and operate as ICAO airline designator CRR, and telephony RAILCAR.

 1 - Cessna Citation Sovereign (Cessna 680)
 1 - Bombardier CL-600

Joint partnership
 Toronto Terminal Railways – management team for Toronto's Union Station with Canadian National Railway.

See also

 Canadian Pacific Air Lines Flight 21
 Canadian Pacific Air Lines Flight 402
 Canadian Pacific Building (London)
 Canadian Pacific Building (New York City)
 Canadian Pacific Building (Toronto)
 Facilities of the Canadian Pacific Railway
 History of Chinese immigration to Canada

References

Further reading

 
 
 
 
 
 
 The Premier's Funeral (11 June 1891). The Woodstock Evening Sentinel Review, p. 1.

External links

 

 
 CPR, from Sea to Sea: The Scottish Connection  – Historical essay, illustrated with photographs from the CPR Archives and the McCord Museum's Notman Photographic Archives
 
 The Canadian Pacific Railway inception – Digital artifacts, archival and graphic material from the UBC Library Digital Collections
 , illustrated account of the construction of the Canadian Pacific Railway

 
S&P/TSX 60
Companies based in Calgary
New York (state) railroads
New Jersey railroads
Pennsylvania railroads
Michigan railroads
Indiana railroads
Illinois railroads
Iowa railroads
Maine railroads
Minnesota railroads
Missouri railroads
North Dakota railroads
South Dakota railroads
Vermont railroads
Wisconsin railroads
British Columbia railways
Alberta railways
Saskatchewan railways
Manitoba railways
Ontario railways
Quebec railways
Defunct New Brunswick railways
Defunct Nova Scotia railways
Rail lines receiving land grants
Defunct Maryland railroads
Defunct Virginia railroads
Defunct Washington, D.C., railroads
Economy of the Midwestern United States
1881 in Canada
Standard gauge railways in Canada
History of transport in Canada
Former defence companies of Canada
Class I railroads in North America
Companies listed on the Toronto Stock Exchange
Companies listed on the New York Stock Exchange
Railway companies established in 1881
Canadian brands
Canadian companies established in 1881
History of the Rocky Mountains